The Sherpa Aircraft Sherpa is an American five-seat utility aircraft designed and built by Sherpa Aircraft Manufacturing Inc. The aircraft is made in two variants, a piston engined K500 and a turboprop K650T. The aircraft has a fixed conventional landing gear with a tailwheel, also available with alternate large tundra tires, skis or floats.

Variants
Sherpa K500
Five-seat variant powered by a Lycoming IO-720 piston engine.

Sherpa K650T
Improved eight-seat variant powered by a Honeywell TPE331 turboprop. One completed and flown by 2011.

Specifications (K500)

References
Notes

Bibliography

External links
 

1990s United States civil utility aircraft